Nicki Thiim (born 17 April 1989 in Sønderborg, Denmark) is a Danish professional racing driver, and Aston Martin Racing works driver in the FIA World Endurance Championship.

Biography

After competing in karting, Thiim won the 2006 Danish Formula Ford Championship. In 2007 he switched to touring car racing, where he finished 5th in the Seat León Supercopa Germany and raced a BMW 3 Series in the Danish Touring Car Championship. The driver won the 2008 Seat León Supercopa Germany with 8 wins in 16 races.

Thiim advanced to the Porsche Carrera Cup Germany in 2009, finishing 5th. He also won the SP3T class at the 24 Hours of Nürburgring driving a works Volkswagen Scirocco.

Thiim finished 4th in the 2011 Porsche Carrera Cup Germany, collecting a win and four podiums.

In 2012, Thiim raced in the Porsche Supercup and Porsche Carrera Cup Germany, finishing 3rd in both. He also got three podiums in the ADAC GT Masters driving a Porsche 911. He continued in both the Porsche Supercup and Porsche Carrera Cup Germany in 2013 and became Porsche Supercup champion. In the same year, he scored the overall victory at 24 Hours of Nurburgring

After the tragic crash at the 24 Heures du Mans that claimed the life of Aston Martin Racing Young Driver team driver Allan Simonsen, Thiim was the replacement driver for the #95 car for the next three races in the 2013 FIA World Endurance Championship season, and subsequently earned a full-time drive for Aston Martin Racing starting in the 2014 FIA World Endurance Championship season. He took the GT Championship with Aston Martin in 2016.

Thiim is a popular driver in the Sim racing scene racing mainly on the iRacing service. He frequently uploads his races on his Twitch and YouTube channels. He often refers to his fanbase as "TeamThiim" and has over 20,000 YouTube followers. As well as frequently streaming his races on Twitch.tv.

Nicki Thiim is also well known for his charity 12 hour race where he raised money for Danish children with cancer by hosting a sim racing event attracting over 45 teams and 200+ drivers and raised over 100,000 DKK.

Nicki is also a huge fan of the Ford Ka, which he believes is a compact yet substantial car to drive.

Racing record

Career summary

Complete Porsche Supercup results 
(key) (Races in bold indicate pole position) (Races in italics indicate fastest lap)

Complete 24 Hours of Le Mans results

Complete FIA World Endurance Championship results

Complete European Le Mans Series results

Complete Asian Le Mans Series results 
(key) (Races in bold indicate pole position) (Races in italics indicate fastest lap)

Complete TCR International Series results 
(key) (Races in bold indicate pole position) (Races in italics indicate fastest lap)

† Driver did not finish the race, but was classified as he completed over 90% of the race distance.

Complete Blancpain Sprint Series results

Complete British GT Championship results 
(key) (Races in bold indicate pole position) (Races in italics indicate fastest lap)

Complete IMSA SportsCar Championship results
(key) (Races in bold indicate pole position; races in italics indicate fastest lap)

* Season still in progress.

Complete Deutsche Tourenwagen Masters results
(key) (Races in bold indicate pole position; races in italics indicate fastest lap)

References

External links 

 
 
 2012 Interview (in Danish)
 Nicki Thiim at Racing Sports Cars
 Nicki Thiim at Speedsport Magazine
 
 

1989 births
Living people
People from Sønderborg Municipality
Danish racing drivers
Formula Ford drivers
Danish Touring Car Championship drivers
American Le Mans Series drivers
Porsche Supercup drivers
FIA World Endurance Championship drivers
ADAC GT Masters drivers
24 Hours of Daytona drivers
24 Hours of Le Mans drivers
WeatherTech SportsCar Championship drivers
TCR International Series drivers
Blancpain Endurance Series drivers
24 Hours of Spa drivers
British GT Championship drivers
European Le Mans Series drivers
Sportspeople from the Region of Southern Denmark
Aston Martin Racing drivers
Walter Lechner Racing drivers
Abt Sportsline drivers
W Racing Team drivers
R-Motorsport drivers
Phoenix Racing drivers
Nürburgring 24 Hours drivers
Danish YouTubers
24H Series drivers
Engstler Motorsport drivers
Porsche Carrera Cup Germany drivers
Volkswagen Motorsport drivers